Whities 010 (also known as Whities 010: Transport for Lewisham) is the first EP by British musician Coby Sey and the 10th release on Whities (now independent record label AD 93), a then white label imprint of Young Turks (now independent label Young). It was released on 10" vinyl and was limited to 300 copies.

Sey wrote and recorded the EP in the Lewisham, London after years of working behind the scenes with London based musicians Tirzah, Mica Levi, DELS, Klein and more.

Music videos
The music video for "All Change" was released on 31 March 2017. The music video for "Active (Peak)" was released on 31 March 2017. Both videos were directed by Coby Sey and Alex McCullough.

Track listing
All tracks written and produced by Coby Sey.

Personnel
Credits adapted from liner notes of Whities 010.
Coby Sey – primary artist, production, instrumentation, photography, mixing, engineering
Alex McCullough – artwork, design
Kwes – mixing, engineering
Matt Colton - mastering

References

External links
 

2017 EPs
Coby Sey albums
Young_Turks_(record_label)_albums